Buena Familia is a 2015 Philippine television drama series broadcast by GMA Network. It premiered on the network's Afternoon Prime line up from July 28, 2015 to March 4, 2016, replacing Yagit.

Mega Manila ratings are provided by AGB Nielsen Philippines.

Series overview

Episodes

July 2015

August 2015

September 2015

October 2015

November 2015

December 2015

January 2016

February 2016

March 2016

References

Lists of Philippine drama television series episodes